Murder on the Fourth of July is a Nancy Drew and Hardy Boys Supermystery crossover novel, published in 1996.

Plot summary
Frank and Joe travel to Seattle to inspect a case of sabotage at a fireworks factory that threatens Independence Day celebrations, while Nancy Drew arrives in the city to participate in celebrations involving Orca Odyssey, an association devoted to the protection of whales. However, when a charge of homicide is filed against Ian O'Brien, a major benefactor, Nancy realizes she must clear his name for the whales' sake. Realizing a connection, the three work together to find answers.

References

External links
Murder on the Fourth of July at Fantastic Fiction
Supermystery series books

Supermystery
1996 American novels
1996 children's books
Novels set in Seattle